This article contains the discography of Romanian singer Anna Lesko.

Studio albums

CD Maxi singles

Singles

Videos

Music video collections

References

Discographies of Romanian artists